The Entrop was a Dutch automobile manufactured by a cycle company in 's Gravenmoer in 1909.  The firm produced over 1500 bicycles, but only four cars.

The company made tricycles with the single wheel at the front. It was powered by an air-cooled engine mounted behind the single front wheel. There was a choice of a single-cylinder engine with a displacement of 417 cm³ and a two-cylinder engine with a displacement of 813 cm³. The weight was 400 kg. Lever steering was used for steering.

References

Car manufacturers of the Netherlands
Cycle manufacturers of the Netherlands
Dutch companies established in 1909
Vehicle manufacturing companies established in 1909